The Sounds of Yusef is an album by multi-instrumentalist Yusef Lateef recorded in 1957 and released on the Prestige label.

Reception

The Allmusic review stated: "The Sounds of Yusef manages to chart some new territory amid his sea of late-'50s recordings. Many of the songs tilt their head toward the East, both rhythmically and in their instrumentation, but the album as a whole still has its feet firmly planted in the jazz tradition".

Track listing 
All compositions by Yusef Lateef, except as indicated
 "Take the "A" Train" (Billy Strayhorn) - 11:10
 "Playful Flute" (Wilbur Harden) - 4:15
 "Love and Humor" - 6:08
 "Buckingham" - 5:06
 "Meditation" - 4:40

Personnel 
Yusef Lateef - tenor saxophone, flute, tambourine, argol
Wilbur Harden - flugelhorn, balloon
Hugh Lawson - piano, Turkish finger cymbals, 7 Up bottle, balloon, bells
Ernie Farrow - bass, rabat
Oliver Jackson - drums, gong, earthboard

References 

Yusef Lateef albums
1958 albums
Albums produced by Bob Weinstock
Albums recorded at Van Gelder Studio
Prestige Records albums